Cyprus participated in the Junior Eurovision Song Contest 2017 which took place on 26 November 2017, in Tbilisi, Georgia. The Cypriot broadcaster Cyprus Broadcasting Corporation (CyBC) was responsible for organising their entry for the contest. Nicole Nicolaou was internally selected to represent Cyprus with the song "I Wanna Be a Star". In Tbilisi she ended last.

Background

Before Junior Eurovision
CyBC was the very first broadcaster which announced that they would be present to the next contest in Tbilisi. They selected their entry internally.

Artist and song information

Nicole Nicolaou
Nicole Nicolaou (born 23 June 2004) is a Cypriot singer and dancer who represented Cyprus in the Junior Eurovision Song Contest 2017 with her song "I Wanna Be a Star".

"I Wanna Be a Star"
"I Wanna Be a Star" is a song by Cypriot singer Nicole Nicolaou. It represented Cyprus during the Junior Eurovision Song Contest 2017. The song is composed and written by the famous singer Constantinos Christoforou.

At Junior Eurovision
During the opening ceremony and the running order draw which took place on 20 November 2017, Cyprus was drawn to perform first on 26 November 2017, preceding Poland.

Voting

Detailed voting results

References 

Junior Eurovision Song Contest
Cyprus
2017